Isauria is a genus of snout moths described by Émile Louis Ragonot in 1887.

Species
Isauria crepusculella (Lederer, 1870)
Isauria dilucidella (Duponchel, 1836)
Isauria kuldgensis Ragonot, 1887
Isauria subsoritella (Ragonot, 1887)
Isauria ubricantella (de Joannis, 1913)

References

Phycitinae
Taxa named by Émile Louis Ragonot
Pyralidae genera